The Michael Ludwig Nemmers Prize in Music Composition is awarded biennially from the Bienen School of Music at Northwestern University. The prize money is US$100,000 and the prize includes a performance by the Chicago Symphony Orchestra. The prize is awarded to contemporary classical composers, "who have significantly influenced the field of composition." The award was established in 2003.

Recipients
2004 John Adams
2006 Oliver Knussen
2008 Kaija Saariaho
2010 John Luther Adams
2012 Aaron Jay Kernis
2014 Esa-Pekka Salonen
2016 Steve Reich
2018 Jennifer Higdon
2021 William Bolcom

References

External links
Bienen School of Music: Michael Ludwig Nemmers Prize in Music Composition

American music awards
Classical music awards
Awards established in 2003